Arthur "Art" Obey (1931/1932 — 1988) was a Canadian ice hockey coach with the Lebret Indians. While Obey coach them Lebret Indians, they dominated amateur hockey for five years. He was a participant in multiple sports and twice received the Tom Longboat Award (1951, 1960). He went on to work in sports and recreation at various locations in Saskatchewan, including initiating the Indian Summer Games in that province. He is considered a "builder and leader in recreation and sport development for Aboriginal people."

Early years 
Arthur Obey was born November 25 in 1931 or 1932 on Piapot First Nation or in Fort Qu'Appelle. His parents were Mr. and Mrs. George Obey of the Sioux and of the Saulteaux First Nation, respectively.

Art Obey attended Lebret Industrial School also known as Qu'Appelle Indian Residential School, Lebret Indian School, or locally as Indian School, located on the outskirts of Lebret, Saskatchewan in the 1940s. The school was run by the Oblates (in charge of the boys) with the assistance of the Grey Nuns (girls). St. Paul's High School later opened at the Indian School in 1948. Four Tom Longboat Award winners are associated with the school including Arthur Obey. The others are George Poitras (1957), Herbert Strongeagle (1953) and Gerald Starr (1954).

Education 
In his early years as a student, Obey spent half day in the fields learning farming techniques and a half day in class. Zeman et al. also report that the first native high school and sports were introduced in 1948 by Father Paul Piechet. "Every boy in that original 1948 high school class...were all members of the hockey team," including Obey. In contrast, Sister Marcoux reports that Mr. Ed Doll started building the juvenile hockey team in 1946. "The Qu'Appelle team sweater was patterned after those of the Montreal Canadiens, with the exception that an "Indian head" replaced the traditional ch logo that the Canadiens wore on the front of their jerseys." Official sources such as the Saskatchewan Hockey Association refer to the hockey team as the Lebret Indians, though other sources occasionally referred to throughout this entry may use Lebret pucksters or the Lebret Eagles.

Art Obey played hockey and baseball and was a "short distance runner" while at the school. "He is well known for his baseball exploits in Southern Saskatchewan and was a top notch pitcher for such clubs as Notre Dame of Wilcox, Fort Qu'Appelle and periodically the Lebret Indians."  A photo of the 1949 Lebret baseball team including Art Obey, part of an article originally published in the Prairie Messenger, was reprinted in The Indian Missionary Record in 1953.  While a student, "from May to October 1949 Obey played baseball at Notre Dame College" on their team. In 1949 Thomas Desnomie and Art Obey co-wrote an article on vocational training at the Lebret Indian School.

He also became involved in the Cadet Movement with the Lebret School's Hugonard Cadet Corps formed in 1942 or 1944, and associated with the Royal Canadian Army Cadets. Sister Marcoux reports that in 1946 Obey did the Cadet Course at Dundern, in 1950 he was elevated to rank of Cadet Major and in 1952 earned the Master Cadet Certificate. In 1950 he was co-instructor of the students. In May 1948 the group won the "Efficiency Trophy" and the "Challenge Cup" given to the best corps in the province. In 1950 they achieved a mark of 85% and won the Eastern Division Shield.

Personal life 
Obey married Yvonne Adams from Muscow [likely means Muscowpetung First Nation] near Fort Qu'Appelle in 1951 (or July 7, 1952). They eventually had four children: 3 boys and a girl, Janet Ann Obey and/or raised a total of nine children. His 'In Memorium' in the Saskatchewan Indian of July–August 1988 notes he left behind his wife Yvonne, 4 daughters and 5 sons. At the time the Zeman et al. interviewed Obey and their book was published (1983) Obey was reported to have been in Meadow Lake, Saskatchewan.

Career 
One source states Obey became Sports Director at Lebret Industrial School in 1950. Another, Zeman et al., interviewed Art Obey for the book Hockey Heritage and reports that Obey dropped out of high school in 1951 to enter the Recreation Leadership and Training Program in Red Deer, Alberta. He then became recreation director at Lebret as part of his in-service recreation program and went on to coach hockey successfully at Lebret until Indian Affairs phased out grades 11–12 in 1959. Obey reports it wiped out Junior "B" hockey at Lebret and that the league ended up folding. Zeman et al. state Junior "B" hockey didn't return until 1962. Obey left Lebret in 1962.

As Coach, Athletics Director and sometimes player at Lebret, the Lebret Indians won:
 1952: Qu'Appelle Valley Intermediate Hockey League, First Place aka Q.V.H.A Champions with "Coach Arthur Obey, star centre player." See photo of winning team in the November 1952 issue of The Indian Missionary Record and on page 42 of Sister Marcoux.
 Junior "B" Atholl Murray Trophy as Junior "B" Champions in 1954-55 (entered Saskatchewan Amateur Hockey Association for first time), 1955–56, 1956–57, 1957–58 and, 1958–59. A photo identifies the St. Paul's High, Lebret, Saskatchewan 1958 Saskatchewan Junior 'B'/Juvenile 'B' Provincial Champions complete with players names in the September 1982 Saskatchewan Indian.
 Juvenile "B" Shield as Juvenile "B" Champions in 1956 (but not according to the Saskatchewan Hockey Association), 1957, 1959 and, 1960. See photo of 1959 Juvenile "B" Team and coaches in the April 1960 Indian Record.
 Juvenile "C" Al Pickard Trophy as Juvenile "C" Champions 1958.
 Midget "C" Ken Price Trophy as Midget "C" Champions, 1958.
 1959: High School Mainline Hockey League Champions.
 1959: Saskatchewan High School Athletic Association, "B" Basketball.

Obey would have played with and later trained George Poitras, and played with Herbert Strongeagle.

He also coached the track and field team which "dominated many local meets from 1955 to 1960." He likely trained Gerald Starr.

Further:
 1954-1959: Balcarres Braves. Southern Saskatchewan Baseball League. Played as a pitcher.
 The Fort Qu'Appelle Sioux Indian hockey team, mostly Lebret graduates with Obey as coach and player, won the Intermediate "C" Champions in 1956–57. 1958 Saskatchewan "C" Championship. 
 Played on the Fort Qu'Appelle Sioux Indians baseball team, 1961 and 1962.

Obey attended a two-week summer school for supervisory staff at residential schools in 1962.

"Obey remained involved with sports at Qu'Appelle into the 1970s, when he served as the Qu'Appelle residence's recreation director."

After "15 years [as] Director of Recreation and Sports at the Lebret Indian residential School, Sask., [Obey was] appointed Executive Director of the new Indian and Metis Friendship Centre at North Battleford" (p. 4), Obey went on to work at Friendship Centres' for a few years before returning "to Piapot to be with his aging parents. By 1969 he was hired at the first full-time recreation director at Fort Qu'Appelle and was the minor hockey coordinator." In 1971, Obey is reported as being the Provincial Recreation Director for Saskatchewan Recreation Program set up under the auspices of the Federation of Saskatchewan Indians (FSI) in Prince Albert. A month later, the same newspaper notes he is a member of the Governing Committee of the first Western Canada Native Winter Games to be held April 7–9, 1972.  In 1974, he is recorded as being "recreation director at the Federation of Saskatchewan Indians' (FSI) new sports centre in Prince Albert in 1974, [and that] the Saskatchewan Indian Winter Games has become an annual event.

Recreation Director,  Gordon Band.

"In 1974 Obey and Fred Sasakamoose...coached the Prince Albert bantam team to the northern final." The Saskatchewan Indian Bantam Hockey Team then went on to play eight exhibition games in Holland and Finland, winning 6.

Became Board member [n.d.] of Lebret Indian School at some point [recorded as a member in 1980] which by 1980 was known as White Calf Collegiate.

In December 1980 he is recorded as being a "resource person" for the Saskatchewan Indian Recreation Directors training program as Art Obey of the F.S.I. and consultant for their (F.I.S.) alcohol and drug program.

At some point in his career he worked for the Meadow Lake District Tribal Council, and as F.S.I. District Representative for the Touchwood - File Hills - Qu'Appelle District (1978 - 1980).

According to the Saskatchewan First Nations Sports Hall of Fame, "Obey (1931-1988) was a builder and leader in recreation and sport development for Aboriginal people... [and his] major accomplishments include coaching the First Nations women's fastball team and in 1974 initiating the Saskatchewan Indian Summer Games. Obey followed that up with the inaugural Saskatchewan Indian Summer Games in 1988. For nearly two decades Obey worked as a recreational coordinator for various native and non-native organizations." He is noted as having coached the first Canadian Women's Softball Team, likely the team previously mentioned.

Awards 
Art Obey received the Tom Longboat Award twice. In 1951, the Regional (R) award at age 20 for Baseball and Hockey and in 1960 the National (N) award at age 29 for Hockey and Baseball.

Appreciation Award at SIWA Conference in 1980 on behalf of the First Canadians women's ball team to both Art Obey and Tony Cote.

References 

1930s births
1988 deaths

First Nations sportspeople
Ice hockey people from Saskatchewan